The 1884 Louisville Eclipse season was a season in American baseball. The team finished with a 68–40 record, third place in the American Association.

There has been some debate over whom the manager of this club was, with some sources listing the club's starting second baseman, Joe Gerhardt, as manager for at least part of the year, with others crediting team official Mike Walsh with either all or part of the year.

Guy Hecker started 75 games for the Eclipse in 1884 and won the American Association Pitching Triple Crown by leading the league in wins, with 52, strikeouts, with 385, and earned run average with 1.80.

Regular season

Season standings

Record vs. opponents

Opening Day lineup

Roster

Player stats

Batting

Starters by position
Note: Pos = Position; G = Games played; AB = At bats; H = Hits; Avg. = Batting average; HR = Home runs; RBI = Runs batted in

Other batters
Note: G = Games played; AB = At bats; H = Hits; Avg. = Batting average; HR = Home runs; RBI = Runs batted in

Pitching

Starting pitchers
Note: G = Games pitched; IP = Innings pitched; W = Wins; L = Losses; ERA = Earned run average; SO = Strikeouts

Other pitchers
Note: G = Games pitched; IP = Innings pitched; W = Wins; L = Losses; ERA = Earned run average; SO = Strikeouts

References

 1884 Louisville Eclipse team page at Baseball Reference

Louisville Colonels seasons
Louisville Eclipse season
Louisville Eclipse